CVMS may refer to:
 Cardinal Vaughan Memorial School
 Canyon Vista Middle School
 Carmel Valley Middle School
 Cerro Villa Middle School
 Circleville Middle School
 Carson Valley Middle School